The 2022 Incarnate Word Cardinals football team represented the University of the Incarnate Word (UIW) as a member of the Southland Conference during the 2022 NCAA Division I FCS football season. The Cardinals played their home games at Gayle and Tom Benson Stadium in San Antonio, Texas. They were led by first-year head coach G. J. Kinne.

On June 24, 2022, Incarnate Word announced that they would remain in the Southland Conference days before they were to transition to the Western Athletic Conference (WAC). Previously in November 2021, the program announced the move of the athletics to the WAC for the 2022 season.

Previous season

The Cardinals finished the 2021 season with a 10–3 overall record, 7–1 in Southland play, to win the Southland Conference championship, their second conference title. They received the Southland's automatic bid to the FCS Playoffs where they defeated Stephen F. Austin in the first round, only to lose in the second round to No. 1 seeded Sam Houston State.

Preseason

Preseason poll
The Southland Conference released their preseason poll on July 20, 2022. The Cardinals were picked to finish second in the conference and received seven first-place votes.

Preseason All–Southland Teams
The Southland Conference announced the 2022 preseason all-conference football team selections on July 13, 2022. UIW had a total of 16 players selected, the highest number in the Southland Conference. 

Offense

1st Team
Lindsey Scott Jr. – Quarterback, SR
Taylor Grimes – Wide Receiver, SR
Nash Jones – Offensive Lineman, JR

2nd Team
Roger McCuller – Tight End/H-Back, RS-SR
Darion Chafin – Wide Receiver, RS-SR
Reid Francis – Offensive Lineman, SR
Caleb Johnson – Offensive Lineman, RS-SR
Carson Mohr – Kicker, SR
Keven Nguyen – Punter, RS-SR

Defense

1st Team
Cameron Preston – Defensive Lineman, RS-SR
Kelechi Anyalebechi – Linebacker, RS-SR
Kaleb Culp – Defensive Back, JR

2nd Team
Isaiah Paul – Linebacker, RS-JR
Elliott Davison – Defensive Back, JR
Brandon Richard – Defensive Back, SR
Ce'Cori Tolds – Kick Returner, RS-SR

Schedule

‡The game vs. Nicholls was previously scheduled as a non-conference game, and was retained as such, even though both schools are still in the Southland Conference.

Personnel

Coaching staff
Source:

Roster
Source:

Depth chart

Postseason honors
The following Cardinals received postseason honors for the 2022 season:

Walter Payton Award
QB  Lindsey Scott Jr. – Graduate Senior

Associated Press FCS All–America First Team
QB  Lindsey Scott Jr. – Graduate Senior

Stats Perform FCS All–America First Team
QB  Lindsey Scott Jr. – Graduate Senior

Stats Perform FCS All–America Second Team
WR  Taylor Grimes – Senior
LB  Kelechi Anyalebechi – Graduate Senior

Associated Press FCS All–America Third Team
WR  Taylor Grimes – Senior
WR  Darion Chafin – Graduate Senior
OL  Caleb Johnson – Graduate Senior
LB  Kelechi Anyalebechi – Graduate Senior

Stats Perform FCS All–America Third Team
WR  Darion Chafin – Graduate Senior

Stats Perform FCS Freshman All–America Team
PR  Kole Wilson – Freshman

Southland Conference Player of the Year
QB  Lindsey Scott Jr. – Graduate Senior

Southland Conference Defensive Player of the Year
LB  Kelechi Anyalebechi – Graduate Senior

All–Southland Conference First–Team
QB  Lindsey Scott, Jr. – Graduate Senior
WR  Taylor Grimes – Senior
WR  Darion Chafin – Graduate Senior
OL  Caleb Johnson – Graduate Senior
OL  Reid Francis – Senior
DL  Chris Whittaker – Graduate Senior
DL  Steven Parker – Senior
LB  Kelechi Anyalebechi – Graduate Senior
DB  Donte Thompson – Junior

All–Southland Conference Second–Team
RB  Marcus Cooper – Graduate Senior
OL  Jimeto Obigbo – Sophomore
OL  Nash Jones – Junior
DB  Kaleb Culp – Junior

Game summaries

No. 9 Southern Illinois

@ Nevada

@ Prairie View A&M

@ Southeastern Louisiana

McNeese

Lamar

@ Nicholls

Faulkner

@ Texas A&M–Commerce

Houston Christian

@ Northwestern State

FCS Playoffs

No. 11 Furman Paladins – Second Round

@ No. 2 Sacramento State Hornets – Quarterfinals

@ No. 4 North Dakota State Bison – Semifinals

Rankings

References

Incarnate Word
Incarnate Word Cardinals football seasons
Southland Conference football champion seasons
Incarnate Word
Incarnate Word Cardinals football